Sarah Ndunde (born 13 February 1997) is a Kenyan rugby sevens player. She competed in the women's tournament at the 2020 Summer Olympics.

References

External links
 

1997 births
Living people
Female rugby sevens players
Olympic rugby sevens players of Kenya
Rugby sevens players at the 2020 Summer Olympics
Place of birth missing (living people)
Kenya international women's rugby sevens players